Lezcano is a surname.

Notable people
Notable people with this surname include:
 Carlos Lezcano, Puerto Rican baseball player
 Carlos Lezcano (painter) (1870-1929), Spanish painter
 Claudio Lezcano, Paraguayan footballer
 Dario Lezcano, Paraguayan footballer
 Ezequiel Lezcano, Argentinian footballer
 Gastón Lezcano, Argentinian footballer 
 Genaro Lezcano, Argentine basketball player
 Jose Lezcano, Panamanian jockey
 Juan Vicente Lezcano, Paraguayan footballer
 Rubén Ramírez Lezcano, Paraguayan politician
 Saúl Cepeda Lezcano, Spanish writer
 Sixto Lezcano, Puerto Rican baseball player

See also
 Lescano

References